The Elektra chord is a "complexly dissonant signature-chord" and motivic elaboration used by composer Richard Strauss to represent the title character of his opera Elektra that is a "bitonal synthesis of E major and C-sharp major" and may be regarded as a polychord related to conventional chords with added thirds, in this case an eleventh chord. It is enharmonically equivalent to a 7#9 chord : D-F-A-C-E and a 6b9 chord : E-G#-B-C#-F.

In Elektra the chord, Elektra's "harmonic signature" is treated various ways betraying "both tonal and bitonal leanings...a dominant 4/2 over a nonharmonic bass." It is associated as well with its seven note complement which may be arranged as a dominant thirteenth while other characters are represented by other motives or chords, such as Klytämnestra's contrasting harmony. The Elektra chord's complement appears at important points and the two chords form a 10-note pitch collection, lacking D and A, which forms one of Elektra's "distinctive 'voices'"

The chord is also found in Claude Debussy's Feuilles mortes, where it may be analyzed as an appoggiatura to a minor ninth chord, and Franz Schreker's Der ferne Klang, and Alexander Scriabin's Sixth Piano Sonata.

See also
Gamma chord
Mystic chord
Petrushka chord
Psalms chord
Tristan chord

References

External links 
 Some occurrences of the Elektra chord in the scores of Petrucci Music Library

Extended chords
Modernism (music)
Richard Strauss